Robert Clark Gregg Jr. (born April 2, 1962) is an American actor, director, and screenwriter. He is best known for playing Agent Phil Coulson in the Marvel Cinematic Universe films Iron Man (2008), Iron Man 2 (2010), Thor (2011), The Avengers (2012), Captain Marvel (2019), and the television spin-off series Agents of S.H.I.E.L.D. (2013–2020) and Disney+ series What If...? (2021). Gregg also voiced Phil Coulson on the animated series Ultimate Spider-Man (2012–2017) and in the video games Lego Marvel Super Heroes (2013), Marvel Heroes (2013), and Lego Marvel's Avengers (2016).

Gregg is also known for his role as FBI Special Agent Mike Casper on the NBC political drama series The West Wing (2001–2004) and as Richard, the ex-husband of Christine Campbell, in the CBS sitcom The New Adventures of Old Christine (2006–2010).

He wrote the horror film What Lies Beneath (2000), and wrote and directed the black comedy Choke (2008) and the comedy-drama Trust Me (2013). He appeared in the films The Adventures of Sebastian Cole (1998), One Hour Photo (2002), In Good Company (2004), When a Stranger Calls (2006), 500 Days of Summer (2009), Much Ado About Nothing (2012), The To Do List (2013), Labor Day (2013), and Live by Night (2016).

Early life
Gregg was born April 2, 1962, in Boston, Massachusetts, the son of Mary Layne (née Shine) and Robert Clark Gregg Sr., an Episcopal priest and Stanford University professor. Because his family relocated frequently, he had lived in seven cities by the time he was 17. He attended high school in Chapel Hill, North Carolina, where his father was a professor at nearby Duke University.

He attended Ohio Wesleyan University for two years before dropping out and moving to Manhattan. He worked various jobs, such as being a bar back, a security guard at the Guggenheim Museum, and a parking valet at a restaurant. He later enrolled at New York University's Tisch School of the Arts, where he studied drama and English, and graduated in 1986.

Career

Gregg was a founding member, and later artistic director, of the off-Broadway Atlantic Theater Company, which formed in 1983. Gregg has been featured in a number of supporting roles in films, such as Lovely & Amazing, The Human Stain, and In Good Company, and a number of guest spots on TV series, such as Will & Grace, Sports Night, Sex and the City and The West Wing. He also wrote the screenplay for the 2000 thriller What Lies Beneath.

He is the director and screenwriter of the 2008 film Choke, based on the Chuck Palahniuk novel of the same name, starring Sam Rockwell. Gregg consulted his father, a retired religion professor at Stanford, for the quotation from Saint Paul's letter to the Galatians which Gregg used in Choke. Gregg's father is also the former chaplain at Stanford Memorial Church.

In 2008, Gregg appeared in the film Iron Man as S.H.I.E.L.D. agent Phil Coulson. In 2010, Gregg reprised his role as Agent Coulson for Iron Man 2. Gregg had since signed up for a multiple film deal as the character with Marvel Studios. In 2011, he returned again as Coulson for Thor. Gregg noted his being a part of the expanding Marvel Cinematic Universe as being very exciting; "Agent Coulson was one of the guys who wasn't really in the comic books, and he was a very kind of small role in Iron Man," he said, "and I was just very lucky that they chose to expand that character and chose to put him more into the universe of it. It's really a blast!" Following on from his appearance in Thor, he again reprised his role in The Avengers. Gregg also stars in a series of Marvel short films that center around his character and can be seen on the Blu-ray releases of the films.

In October 2010, Gregg was part of the cast of a staged reading of Larry Kramer's The Normal Heart alongside Dylan Walsh, Lisa Kudrow, and Tate Donovan, presented in Los Angeles on the occasion of the play's 25th anniversary (and preceding the play's 2011 Broadway premiere, which retained elements of this staged reading); the reading was directed by his then-father-in-law, Joel Grey.

From 2013 to 2020, Gregg portrayed Agent Phil Coulson in the ABC television superhero drama series Agents of S.H.I.E.L.D., set within the MCU, alongside Ming-Na Wen and Chloe Bennet. He also went on to direct episodes in seasons five and six.

On April 20, 2013, Trust Me, a film written, produced, and directed by Gregg, premiered at the Tribeca Film Festival. The film found limited release in the United States in June 2014.

Gregg reprised his role as Agent Coulson in the 2019 superhero film Captain Marvel and the animated series What If...?, episodes "What If... the World Lost Its Mightiest Heroes?" and "What If... Thor Were an Only Child?", released in 2021.

In 2022, he joined the TNT series Snowpiercer for its fourth and final season. However, the series was dumped by the network before it could air there, and is in the process of moving elsewhere.

Personal life

Gregg married actress Jennifer Grey on July 21, 2001; the couple co-starred in the Lifetime TV movie Road to Christmas. They have a daughter Stella, born December 3, 2001. Gregg and Grey were two of the demonstrators at the 2017 Women's March held on January 21, 2017 in Washington, D.C. On July 3, 2020, Grey and Gregg announced they had separated amicably on January 18, 2020, and were in the process of divorcing. Their divorce ruling was issued in November and that became official finalized on February 16, 2021.

Gregg is a sober alcoholic, and describes himself as a member of a Jewish family (his ex-wife's faith).

He has a black belt in Brazilian jiu-jitsu.

Gregg is a cousin of New York City government official and former mayoral candidate Kathryn Garcia.

Filmography

Film

Television

Video games

Awards and nominations

References

External links

 
 
 

1962 births
20th-century American male actors
21st-century American male actors
American Episcopalians
American male film actors
American male screenwriters
American male television actors
American male voice actors
American practitioners of Brazilian jiu-jitsu
People awarded a black belt in Brazilian jiu-jitsu
Film directors from Massachusetts
Film directors from North Carolina
Living people
Male actors from Boston
Male actors from North Carolina
People from Chapel Hill, North Carolina
Tisch School of the Arts alumni
Ohio Wesleyan University alumni
Writers from Boston
Screenwriters from Massachusetts